Glen Raven may refer to:

 Glen Raven, North Carolina, a town in Alamance County, North Carolina, US
 Glen Raven, Inc., a fabric manufacturer headquartered in Glen Raven, North Carolina, US
 Glen Raven (Cedar Hill, Tennessee), a mansion on the US National Register of Historic Places